Sweden chose their entrant for the Eurovision Song Contest 1961 through Melodifestivalen 1961. The song "April, april", performed once with Siw Malmkvist, once with Gunnar Wiklund, won. However, none of them was considered acceptable for singing in ESC, so Lill-Babs was chosen as representative instead. In the contest, once more held in Cannes, she finished in 14th place (out of 16).

Before Eurovision

Melodifestivalen 1961

Melodifestivalen 1961 was the Swedish national final and it was the third time that this system of picking a song had been used. One singer performed the song with a large orchestra and one with a smaller orchestra. Approximately 550 songs were submitted to SVT for the competition. The final was held in the Cirkus in Stockholm on 6 February 1961, broadcast on Sveriges Radio TV, but was not broadcast on radio. Siw Malmkvist won with "April, april" but Lill-Babs went to Eurovision.

: Performer with large orchestra
: Performer with smaller orchestra

At Eurovision 
On the night of the final, Lill-Babs performed 7th in the running order, following the Netherlands and preceding Germany.

At the close of the voting "April, april" had received only 2 points (from France), placing Sweden 14th of the 16 competing entries.

Voting 
Every country had a jury of ten people. Every jury member could give one point to his or her favourite song.

References

External links
Swedish National Final page

1961
Countries in the Eurovision Song Contest 1961
1961
Eurovision
Eurovision

es:Melodifestivalen 1961
pt:Melodifestivalen 1961
sv:Melodifestivalen 1961